Sebastián Alejandro Martelli (born March 13, 1996) is an Argentine footballer who plays for Argentino de Quilmes.

Career
Martelli debuted for Vélez Sarsfield under José Oscar Flores' coaching, in a 0–1 defeat to Belgrano for the 2014 Argentine Primera División season.

The midfielder played the 2015–16 on loan in México, first for Veracruz and later for Lobos BUAP.

References

External links
Sebastián Martelli at Soccerway
Profile at Ascenso MX 

1996 births
Living people
Argentine footballers
Argentine expatriate footballers
Association football midfielders
Club Atlético Vélez Sarsfield footballers
C.D. Veracruz footballers
Lobos BUAP footballers
Club Atlético Temperley footballers
Coquimbo Unido footballers
Club Almirante Brown footballers
Argentino de Quilmes players
Argentine Primera División players
Primera B de Chile players
Liga MX players
Argentine expatriate sportspeople in Chile
Argentine expatriate sportspeople in Mexico
Expatriate footballers in Chile
Expatriate footballers in Mexico
Footballers from Buenos Aires